Sandy Lerner,  (born 1955) is an American businesswoman and philanthropist. She co-founded Cisco Systems, and used the money from its sale to pursue interests in animal welfare and women's writing. One of her main projects, Chawton House, is in England, but most of her work remains in the United States.

Early life and education
Lerner is a northern California native. She received her bachelor's degree in 1975 in international relations from California State University, Chico, a master's degree in econometrics in 1977 from the Claremont Graduate School, and a master's degree in statistics and computer science in 1981 from Stanford University.

Cisco
In 1984, while working as director of computer facilities for the Stanford University Graduate School of Business, Lerner co-founded Cisco Systems with her then-partner and now-former husband Len Bosack. Lerner and Bosack worked with Stanford students and faculty on a project to better connect all of the school's computer systems. They later adapted software used at Stanford into what would become the foundation for Cisco IOS.

Lerner told the story of Cisco's startup on the podcast How I Built This in which Cisco's early days involved building routers in the living room, financing the business using credit cards. She emphasized the collaborative nature of the work and that despite communication protocols being public domain, developed largely from collaborative work at Stanford, Cisco was still able to produce products people wanted to buy.

Lerner and Bosack brought in John Morgridge to be the third CEO of Cisco in 1988.  On August 28, 1990, Lerner was fired; upon hearing the news, Bosack resigned in solidarity. The two sold all of their stock for $170 million and retired from Cisco. Lerner and Bosack divorced in the early 1990s.

Other business projects
In 1996, Lerner purchased Ayrshire Farm, an  estate in Upperville Virginia. The circa-1912, 42-room Edwardian mansion of native fieldstone has since been restored and was used for a variety of social functions under Lerner's direction. Ayrshire Farm's mission has been to farm sustainably and profitably, promoting the benefits of locally produced, humanely-raised meats and organic produce to the consumer, the community, and children through education, outreach and example. The farm was the first in Virginia to meet both Certified Humane and Certified Organic standards.

Lerner placed a portion of her stock earnings into a start-up venture capital limited partnership called "& Capital Partners." One of the companies it funded was Urban Decay Cosmetics, with the tag line "does pink make you puke?" In February 2000, Moet-Hennessy Louis Vuitton (LVMH), the French luxury goods conglomerate, acquired the firm. It was spun off from LVMH in December 2002. 

Lerner also owns Hunter's Head Tavern in Upperville, Virginia and Gentle Harvest in Marshall, Virginia.

Artistic projects and philanthropy
In 1992, through the foundation she shares with Leonard Bosack, Lerner invested money into the restoration of the Chawton House, which was once owned by Jane Austen's brother, Edward Austen Knight. In 2003, it opened as the Centre for the Study of Early Women's Writing, 1600–1830. In 2016, Lerner resigned from the board of trustees and withdrew the financial support of her foundation.

In November 2011, Lerner published a sequel to Jane Austen's Pride and Prejudice titled Second Impressions using the pen name of Ava Farmer (for "a Virginia farmer"). In August 2017, Lerner released Caticons, a book of art imitating cats. Cat news website, The Purrington Post said that the book was a "Must have" for cat lovers.

Awards and recognition
Lerner was awarded an honorary degree in 2005 from Southampton University and a Doctor of Sciences in 2012 from California State University, Chico.

In 2009, the Institute of Electrical and Electronics Engineers Computer Society honored Sandra Lerner and Leonard Bosack with its Computer Entrepreneur Award "for founding Cisco Systems and pioneering and advancing the commercialization of routing technology and the profound changes this technology enabled in the computer industry."

In 1998, Lerner was featured in part 2 of the PBS documentary Nerds 2.0.1. Lerner was also featured in the documentary film Something Ventured (2011).

In November 2014, Lerner was presented with the Pioneer Award for her work in the technology field by Women's Entrepreneurship Day.

In 2015, Lerner was presented with an honorary OBE by the Lord Lieutenant of Hampshire, Nigel Atkinson, for her contributions to UK culture. The ceremony was held at the Chawton House.

References

  

California State University, Chico alumni
Living people
People from Upperville, Virginia
Cisco people
1955 births
Women Internet pioneers
American technology company founders
Claremont Graduate University alumni
Stanford University alumni
Stanford University staff
American women company founders
American women computer scientists
American computer scientists
Honorary Officers of the Order of the British Empire
21st-century American women